Atagema boucheti is a species of sea slug or dorid nudibranch, a marine gastropod mollusc in the family Discodorididae.

Distribution 
This species has been reported from the Indo-Pacific region.

References

Discodorididae
Gastropods described in 2001